The Grantville Historic District, in Grantville, Georgia, is a historic district which was listed on the National Register of Historic Places in 1991.

The district is bounded by U.S. Route 29, LaGrange St., W. Grantville Rd. and the city cemetery.

It includes railroad tracks through the center of the district, with commercial buildings on both sides, mostly brick buildings. It includes residential areas and two historic mill complexes with mill villages.  It also includes a school, a waterworks, an auditorium, several churches and, on the eastern edge of the district, the city cemetery.

Gallery

References

Historic districts on the National Register of Historic Places in Georgia (U.S. state)
National Register of Historic Places in Coweta County, Georgia
Georgian architecture in Georgia (U.S. state)
Victorian architecture in Georgia (U.S. state)

Buildings and structures completed in 1852